Eucryphia wilkiei is a species of rainforest shrubs endemic to restricted areas of cloud forests on mountain tops in the Wet Tropics region of northeastern Queensland, Australia. , botanists classify Eucryphia in the family Cunoniaceae.

In Jan. 1970 Jack (John H.) Wilkie (1902–1997), orchid expert and botanical explorer of the Mount Bellenden Ker region, was the first European–Australian person to scientifically discover them. Bernie Hyland formally scientifically described the species name in 1997.

Eucryphia wilkiei’s, endemic, very restricted distribution has obtained the conservation status of "vulnerable", officially listed in the regulation current , of the Queensland government legislation, the Nature Conservation Act 1992.

References

wilkie
Flora of Queensland
Oxalidales of Australia
Trees of Australia
Taxa named by Bernard Hyland